Pamelya Herndon (born November 23, 1952) is an American attorney, accountant, and politician who was appointed to serve as a member of the New Mexico House of Representatives from the 28th district.

Early life and education 
Herndon was born November 23, 1952 in Hempstead, Texas to Kathryn and Daniel Norris Herndon. She is African-American. After attending Roy Miller High School, she earned a Bachelor of Business Administration in accounting from Howard University in 1975 and a Juris Doctor from the University of Texas School of Law in 1978.

Career 
Herndon moved to Denver in 1978, where she worked at an accounting firm. She was then hired by the Internal Revenue Service as a litigation attorney. She moved to Albuquerque, New Mexico in 1983. In 1998, Herndon joined the litigation division of the Attorney General of New Mexico's office. In 2006, she was appointed general counsel of the New Mexico Regulation and Licensing Department. In 2009, she became deputy secretary of the New Mexico General Services Department. Herndon operated an independent legal practice until becoming executive director of the Southwest Women's Law Center in 2012. In October 2018, she became president and CEO of the KWH Law Center for Social Justice and Change. She has taught law courses at the University of New Mexico School of Law and paralegal courses at Brookline College–Albuquerque. Herndon has also hosted radio programs on KUNM.

New Mexico House of Representatives 
On June 22, 2021, Herndon was appointed to the New Mexico House of Representatives by members of the Bernalillo County Commission. Herndon represents the 28th district, which was vacated when Melanie Stansbury resigned to serve in the United States House of Representatives.

Personal life 
Herndon married Alfred Mathewson in 1978. They have three children. Mathewson is an emeritus professor and former co-dean at the University of New Mexico School of Law.

References 

American accountants
People from Hempstead, Texas
Howard University alumni
University of Texas School of Law alumni
Democratic Party members of the New Mexico House of Representatives
Women state legislators in New Mexico
New Mexico lawyers
Politicians from Albuquerque, New Mexico
Living people
1952 births
21st-century American women lawyers
21st-century American lawyers
African-American state legislators in New Mexico
African-American women in politics
21st-century American women politicians
20th-century American women lawyers
20th-century American lawyers
African-American women lawyers
African-American lawyers
20th-century African-American women
21st-century African-American women
21st-century American politicians